Rowing at the 1948 Summer Olympics featured seven events, for men only. Competitions were held over the Henley Royal Regatta course from 5 to 9 August.

Medal summary

Participating nations
A total of 310 rowers from 27 nations competed at the London Games:

Medal table

References

External links
 International Olympic Committee medal database

 
1948 Summer Olympics events
1948
Oly
Regattas on the River Thames